David Forman (3 November 1745 – 12 September 1797) was born in Monmouth County, New Jersey of parents Joseph Forman and Elizabeth Lee. His father was a wealthy shipowner and he was educated at Princeton. At the start of the American Revolutionary War he rallied to the patriot cause and was appointed lieutenant colonel of a New Jersey state regiment. When his commander assumed command of the brigade, he was promoted colonel of the regiment during the New York and New Jersey Campaign in 1776. At the time of the battles of Trenton and Princeton Forman's regiment waged a merciless war against the American Loyalists of Monmouth County. Then and later he became known as "Devil David" for his zeal in suppressing the local Tories. In January 1777, the Continental Congress authorized him to raise Forman's Additional Continental Regiment with the rank of colonel in the Continental Army.

In March 1777 he was promoted brigadier general of New Jersey militia. He led a militia brigade in an unsuccessful attack at Germantown in October 1777. He resigned his general's commission because of political troubles but continued to assist the revolutionary cause. At the Battle of Monmouth he served on the staff of Charles Lee as an adviser. When local guides failed to appear on time, he directed the vanguard on the correct route. When Charles Hector, comte d'Estaing's French fleet appeared off the coast soon afterward, Forman stepped in as a liaison between the French and George Washington. His regiment was absorbed by Spencer's Additional Continental Regiment in April 1779. He organized a system of outposts on the coast in 1780 that reported British and French ship movements. This information was passed on to Washington. Late in the war, he played a small role in the Asgill Affair.

After the war he had portraits done by James Sharples and in about 1784 by Charles Willson Peale. He and his wife Ann Marsh had eleven children; of these only five daughters survived him. A slaveowner, he bought a property at Natchez, Mississippi and sent 60 of his slaves to work there in 1789. He was admitted as an honorary and then original member of The Society of the Cincinnati in the state of New Jersey and served as Vice President of the New Jersey Society from 1791 to 1793. The following year he moved to Maryland. In 1796 he traveled to Natchez where he had a debilitating stroke the following spring. The dying man took a ship home but it was captured by a British privateer and brought into The Bahamas where he succumbed on 12 September 1797.

References

Notes

External links
 The Society of the Cincinnati
 The American Revolution Institute

1745 births
1797 deaths
Continental Army officers from New Jersey
People of colonial New Jersey
People from Monmouth County, New Jersey
Militia generals in the American Revolution
Patriots in the American Revolution
Burials at Old Tennent Cemetery